Mehr Irshad Ahmed Sial Awan is a Pakistani politician who has been a member of the National Assembly of Pakistan since August 2018. He was born on January 1, 1967, at Muzzaffargarh.

Political career
He was elected to Provincial Assembly of the Punjab as candidate of PPP from PP 254 Muzaffargarh in 2008 Pakistan general elections.
He was elected to the National Assembly of Pakistan from Constituency NA-182 (Muzaffargarh-II) as a candidate of Pakistan Peoples Party in 2018 Pakistani general election.

References

Living people
Pakistani MNAs 2018–2023
Pakistan People's Party politicians
1967 births
People from Muzaffargarh
Politicians from Muzaffargarh